Hana Černá (born May 17, 1974 in Brno, Jihomoravský) is a retired female freestyle and medley swimmer from the Czech Republic. She competed in three consecutive Summer Olympics, starting in 1992 for Czechoslovakia.

References

1974 births
Living people
Czech female swimmers
Czech female freestyle swimmers
Female medley swimmers
Swimmers at the 1992 Summer Olympics
Swimmers at the 1996 Summer Olympics
Swimmers at the 2000 Summer Olympics
Olympic swimmers of Czechoslovakia
Olympic swimmers of the Czech Republic
Sportspeople from Brno
European Aquatics Championships medalists in swimming
Czechoslovak female swimmers
Universiade medalists in swimming
Universiade gold medalists for the Czech Republic
Universiade silver medalists for the Czech Republic
Universiade bronze medalists for the Czech Republic
Medalists at the 1997 Summer Universiade
Medalists at the 1999 Summer Universiade
Medalists at the 2001 Summer Universiade